The 1986 FIFA World Cup knockout stage was the second and final stage of the 1986 FIFA World Cup finals in Mexico. The stage began on 15 June 1986, and ended with the final at the Estadio Azteca in Mexico City on 29 June 1986. 

Sixteen teams advanced to the knockout stage to compete in a single-elimination style tournament: The top two teams from each of the six groups, as well as the best four third-placed teams. In the round of 16, the four third-placed teams played against four of the group winners from group A-D, with the remaining two group winners from group E and F taking on two of the group runners-up; the remaining four runners-up were paired off against each other. The winners of the eight round of 16 matches were then paired together in the quarter-finals, the winners of which played against each other in the semi-finals.

The ties in each round were played over a single match; in the event that scores were level after 90 minutes, the teams would play an additional 30 minutes of extra time, divided into two 15-minute halves, to determine the winner. If the scores remained level after extra time, the teams would contest a penalty shootout.

A third place match was also held on the day before the final, between the two losing teams of the semi-finals.

Qualified teams

The top two placed teams from each of the six groups, plus the four best-placed third teams, qualified for the knockout stage.

Based on group results, the matches would be the following in Round of 16:

The pairings for matches 1, 4, 5 and 8 depend on who the best third places are that qualify for the round of 16. The following table published in Section 28 of the tournament regulations, shows the different options to define the rivals of the winners of groups A, B, C and D.

</onlyinclude>

Bracket

Round of 16

Mexico vs Bulgaria

Soviet Union vs Belgium

Brazil vs Poland

Argentina vs Uruguay

Italy vs France

Morocco vs West Germany

England vs Paraguay

Denmark vs Spain

Quarter-finals

Brazil vs France

West Germany vs Mexico

Argentina vs England

Spain vs Belgium

Semi-finals

France vs West Germany

Argentina vs Belgium

Third place play-off
As both were European teams, this was already set pre-match as the second consecutive World Cup in which European teams finished third.

Final

External links

Knockout Stage
1986
Knockout stage
Knockout stage
Knockout stage
Knockout stage
Knockout stage
Knockout stage
Knockout stage
Knockout stage
Knockout stage
Knockout stage
Knockout stage
Knockout stage
Knockout stage
Knockout stage
Knockout stage
Knockout stage
1986
FIFA World Cup 1986